Qassim Haddad (born 1948) is a Bahraini poet, particularly notable within the Arab world for his free verse poetry. His poems have been translated in several languages including German, English and French.

Biography
Qassim Haddad was born in Bahrain in 1948 and did not complete his secondary education, having educated himself over the years. Haddad first rose to prominence with his poetry that contained revolutionary and political themes such as freedom. He published his first poetic collection titled Good Omen in 1970 and has since published more than 16 books, including Majnun Laila, a book of poetry and paintings, and a book of poetry in collaboration with Saudi photographer Saleh al-Azzaz. In 2007, Haddad created controversy when he reworked the Arabic classic Layla and Majnun, with Marcel Khalife which fundamentalists believed undermined Islamic morals.

He worked in the public library from 1968 to 1975, but was in and out of political incarceration for five years’ total between 1973 and 1980. In 1980, he joined the Culture and Arts Department at the Ministry of Information. His column, "وقت للكتابة" (“Time to Write”), has been syndicated weekly in a number of Arab publications since the early 1980s as well. His poems have been extensively translated, and he retired from the Ministry at the end of 1997.

Haddad is also the co-founder and chairman of the Bahraini Writers' Union.

Personal life
He is married and has three children, including his son the noted composer Mohammed Haddad (born 1975) and his daughters Mehyar and noted photographer Tufool. He has three granddaughters (Amina, Ramz, and Lamar).

Translations
Among the most prominent translations of Haddad's work are the collection علاج المسافة (“Distance Therapy”), rendered as Rimedio per la distanza in a translation to Italian by Fawzi Al Delmi by San Marco dei Giustiniani in Genoa, Italy. The American University in Cairo also launched a translation project spearheaded by John Verlenden (Professor of Rhetoric and Authorship) and Ferial Ghazoul (Professor of English Language and Comparative Literature, funding it through a $100,000 grant from the United States National Endowment for the Humanities.

Haddad's website جهة الشعر (“Jehat”) was launched in 1996 and posted Modern Standard Arabic poetry in its original form and translated into seven languages. In March 2018, however, new additions to the site were suspended due to lack of funds.

Haddad was awarded the “Arab Creativity Award” from the Lebanese Cultural Forum in Paris in 2000 and won the Al Owais Award in the poetry category in the 2000-2001 cycle. In 2017, he won the Aboul-Qacem Echebbi Award on its 2017 return to Tunisia after a hiatus since the Tunisian Revolution of 2011, along with the third Poet Mohammed Al-Thubaiti Prize in Saudi Arabia. In 2020, he was regaled at the Fifth Cairo International Forum for Arab Poetry.

Between 2008 and 2015, Haddad received four scholarships for literary residencies in Germany. He completed the book طرفة بن الوردة (“The Rose of Tarafa”) during a 2008-2011 residency at the German Commission for Cultural Exchange in Berlin, followed by a 2012 Jean-Jacques Rousseau Fellowship from the Akademie Schloss Solitude in Stuttgart, a 2013 grant from the Heinrich Böll Foundation in Cologne, and a 2014 PEN Centre Germany in Munich. These allowed him to complete the following freelance projects, besides the aforementioned طرفة بن الوردة:
 تجربتيّ (“My Experience”)
 أيها الفحم يا سيدي (“Oh, Sir Charcoal”)
 لستِ جرحاً ولا خنجراً (“You Are Neither a Wound Nor a Dagger”)
 نزهة الملاك (“Angel’s Outing”)
 فتنة السؤال (“The Sedition of Question”)
 النهايات تنأى (“Endings Disperse”)
 سماء عليلة (“An Ailing Sky”)
 تعديل في موسيقى الحجرة (“Revisions to Chamber Music”)
 مكابدات الأمل (“The Struggles of Hope”)
 يوميات بيت هاينريش بول (“Diary from the Heinrich Böll Foundation”)
 ثلاثون بحراً للغرق (“Thirty Seas of Drowning”)
 مثل وردةٍ تقلّد عطراً (“Like a Rose Imitating Perfume”)

Work
Three phases can be distinguished in Haddad's poetic career. The first consists of his first three collections: البشارة (“Portents,” 1970), خروج رأس الحسين من المدن الخائنة (“The Exodus of Ras Al-Husayn from the Treacherous Cities,” 1972), and الدم الثاني (“The Second Blood,” 1975). In these three collections, his rhetoric and lyricism rejects the status quo and calls for revolution. The allusions are often to mythic figures such as Sisyphus, Scheherezade, Penelope, and Antarah ibn Shaddad, as well as to modern colonial resistance symbols such as Che Guevara, Vietnam, and Palestine.

The second phase includes the collections قلب الحب (“Love’s Heart”) and القيامة (“Judgment Day”), both published in 1980. These more experimentally introspective works transform the subjective ego into an objective collective one and include richer, more transcendent language. Many collections through 1991 continued to build on this theme.

The third stage builds on his interest in aesthetics, including linguistic experimentation and the use of sound, symbols, and metaphor. His 1983 collection شظايا (“Splinters”) is a long poem applying shock and tension to the lyric approach of the era.

His fourth stage centers on collaborations with artists in other media. These works include الجواشن (“Armour”), a long-form work co-written by novelist Amin Saleh; the aforementioned أخبارمجنون ليلى  (“Majnun Laila,” painted by Iraqi artist Dia Azzawi and set to music by Marcel Khalife); جوه مع (“Faces”) with Bahraini painter Ebrahim Busaad, singer-songwriter Khaled El Sheikh, the poet Adunis, and the playwright Abdullah Youssef. المستحيل الأزرق (“The Blue Impossible”) with photographer Saleh al-Azzaz is a recent highlight, as are طرفة بن الوردة and أيها الفحم يا سيدي, both among his residency works and featuring the work of his photographer daughter Tufool and his composer son Mohammed.

Publications

Public appearances

Festivals

Seminars

Conventions

International Conferences

Studies of Haddad’s work

References

External links
Official website

20th-century Bahraini poets
Living people
1948 births
21st-century Bahraini poets